Dromaeosauripus is an ichnogenus that has been attributed to dromaeosaurs. Dromaeosauripus footprints have been found at Dinosaur Ridge in the United States, Bito Island Tracksite in South Korea's Bito Island, and the Hekou Group in China.

Dromaeosauripus yongjingensis
In 2012, D. yongjingensis was described from tracks in the Hekou Group. D. yongjingensis shows prominent toe and heel pads. Heel pads are apparently absent in other Dromaeosauripus, probably due to behavior, preservation, and/or substrate consistency.

See also
 List of dinosaur ichnogenera
 Ichnology

References

Dinosaur trace fossils